In Ashkenazi Jewish cuisine, gribenes or grieven ("cracklings") are crisp chicken or goose skin cracklings with fried onions. As with other cracklings, gribenes are a byproduct of rendering animal fat to produce cooking fat, in this case kosher schmaltz.

A favored food in the past among Ashkenazi Jews, gribenes is frequently mentioned in Jewish stories and parables.

Gribenes can be used as an ingredient in other dishes like kasha varnishkes, fleishig kugel and gehakte leber.

Holiday food
This dish is often associated with the Jewish holidays Hanukkah and Rosh Hashanah. Traditionally, gribenes were served with potato kugel or latkes during Hanukkah.

Gribenes are also associated with Passover, as large amounts of schmaltz, with its resulting gribenes, were traditionally used in Passover recipes.

Servings
Gribenes can be eaten as a snack, typically on rye or pumpernickel bread with salt,<ref>Amy Scattergood, "Chef recipes: A Recipe From the Chef: Ilan Hall's Gribenes Sandwich," 'LA Weekly, December 23, 2009. Found at LA Weekly website . Accessed January 4, 2011.</ref> or used in recipes such as chopped liver, or all of the above. It is often served as a side dish with pastrami on rye or hot dogs.Frank Bruni, "Quit Kibitzing and Pass the Gribenes", New York Times, February 13, 2008. Found at New York Times website. Accessed January 4, 2011.

This dish has also been eaten as a midnight snack, or as an appetizer. Some Jews in Louisiana add gribenes to Jambalaya in place of (treyf) shrimp. It was served to children on challah bread as a treat. It is also sometimes served in a GLT, a modified version of a BLT sandwich that replaces bacon with gribenes.

Etymology
The word gribenes is related to German Griebe (plural Grieben) meaning 'piece of fat, crackling' (from Old High German griobo via Middle High German griebe), where Griebenschmalz'' is lard from which the cracklings have not been removed.

See also
 Jewish cuisine
 List of chicken dishes
 Taillé aux greubons

References

External links
 "How to Make Gribenes" from the Jewish Journal online

Ashkenazi Jewish cuisine
Israeli cuisine
Chicken dishes
Skin
Yiddish words and phrases
Fried foods